Zanthoxylum fagara or wild lime, is a species of flowering plant that—despite its name—is not part of the genus Citrus with real limes and other fruit, but is a close cousin in the larger citrus family, Rutaceae. It is native to southern Florida and Texas in the United States, and to Mexico, Central America, the Caribbean, and South America as far south as Paraguay. Common names include: lime prickly-ash, wild lime, colima, uña de gato, and corriosa.

Description
The irregularly-shaped branches contain hooked spines with pinnate  leaves. The leaves and bark can be crushed to make a bitter-tasting condiment, and much of the tree smells similar to citrus. Lime prickly-ash has a high drought tolerance and grows best in full sun, but it can also survive as an understory shrub. It provides significant food and cover for native wildlife and the leaves host the larvae of many butterflies, such as the giant swallowtail (Papilio cresphontes).

Uses
The powdered bark and leaves have been used as a spice, with an odor similar to that of limes.

References

External links

fagara
Plants described in 1890
Trees of the Southeastern United States
Trees of the South-Central United States
Trees of Mexico
Trees of South America